The Sharp PC-1600 was a pocket computer introduced by Sharp in 1986 as a successor to the PC-1500. The PC-1600 provided compatibility with its predecessor through the use of a slave CPU that could run assembly language programs targeting the older machine. It could also switch into a compatibility mode so that programs written for the single line display of the PC-1500 could work with the four line display of the PC-1600.

PC-1500 peripherals such as the CE-150 cassette interface were also supported.

Technical specifications
SC7852 CMOS 8 bit microprocessor, equivalent to the Z-80A, 3.58 MHz
LH-5803 slave CPU compatible with PC-1500, 1.3 MHz
LU57813P sub CPU, 307.2 kHz
96K ROM
16K RAM, expandable to 80K
26 column, 4 line LCD with a 5x7 character matrix
156x32 dot graphics
Real time clock
RS-232C interface
Optical serial port
Analogue interface for connection to sensors
390 g in weight with batteries

Accessories
CE-1600M program module providing 32K of battery backed storage
CE-1600P Printer/Cassette interface
CE-1600F 2.5-inch double-sided pocket disk drive providing 64K of storage per side with CE-1650F media

See also
 Sharp pocket computer character sets

References

Further reading

External links
The Ultimate Pocket Computer Original product brochures and source for accessories
Sharp PC-1600 site by Harald Richter German with sections in English and French

PC-1600
PC-1600